The History Student is a 2015 feature film from Irish director Graham Jones about a seven-year-old boy from Dublin who is spending a rural summer holiday in his mother's native Poland and on strict instructions to speak only that country's language - when he finds the words to ask where aliens fit into nature, it stirs memories of her own childhood when the answer was clear.

References

External links 
 

2015 films
Irish drama films
Polish drama films
2010s Polish-language films